Abubaker Haydar Abdalla (born 28 August 1996) is a Sudanese-born Qatari middle-distance runner. He competed in the men's 800 metres at the 2016 Summer Olympics.

He has qualified to represent Qatar at the 2020 Summer Olympics.

References

External links
 

1996 births
Living people
Qatari male middle-distance runners
Olympic male middle-distance runners
Olympic athletes of Qatar
Athletes (track and field) at the 2016 Summer Olympics
Asian Games bronze medalists for Qatar
Asian Games medalists in athletics (track and field)
Athletes (track and field) at the 2018 Asian Games
Medalists at the 2018 Asian Games
World Athletics Championships athletes for Japan
Asian Athletics Championships winners
Asian Indoor Athletics Championships winners
Qatari people of Sudanese descent
Sudanese emigrants to Qatar
Naturalised citizens of Qatar
Athletes (track and field) at the 2020 Summer Olympics